Smith Granite Company  In 1845 Orlando Smith discovered a granite outcrop on the property owned by Joshua Babcock in Westerly, Rhode Island, and a year later purchased the site from him.  He established a granite quarry shortly thereafter and by the 1850s was cutting granite monuments.  In 1887 the Smith Granite Company was incorporated, with family members holding all the stock.

The company's sculptors included James G. C. Hamilton, Edward Ludwig Albert Pausch, Robert D. Barr, and Stanley Edwards.

Works
	
The firm is best remembered for creating Civil War monuments.

 Gettysburg Battlefield, at least 57 monuments.
Chickamauga and Chattanooga National Military Park, at least 16 monuments.
 as well as numerous other Civil War monuments including ones in:

 Norfolk, Connecticut,  1870
 Galena, Illinois,  1883
 Danbury, Connecticut,  1894
 Gardner, Massachusetts,  1885
 New Haven, Connecticut,  1887
 Meadville, Pennsylvania,  1891
 Big Rapids, Michigan,  1892
 Ypsilanti, Michigan,  1895
 New London, Connecticut,  1896
 Norwalk, Connecticut, 1900
 Wallingford, Connecticut,  1902
 Norwich, Connecticut, 1902
 New Haven, Connecticut,  1905
 Griswold, Connecticut,  1913

 Firemen's Monument, New London, Connecticut,  1898
 World War I monument, Templeton, Massachusetts,  1922
the bases or granite components of many public monuments including:
General William Tecumseh Sherman Monument, Washington D.C.

References

Granite companies
Mining companies of the United States
Companies based in Rhode Island
American companies established in 1887
Non-renewable resource companies established in 1887
1887 establishments in Rhode Island